Teratopora agramma is a moth in the family Erebidae. It was described by George Hampson in 1914. It is found on New Guinea, where it has been recorded from Papua New Guinea and Papua (eastern part of the Central Mountain Range). The habitat consists of mountainous areas.

References

Moths described in 1914
Lithosiina